Madisonburg is an unincorporated community and census-designated place (CDP) in Miles Township, Centre County, Pennsylvania, United States. It is part of the State College, Pennsylvania Metropolitan Statistical Area. The population was 168 at the 2010 census.

Geography
Madisonburg is located in eastern Centre County at  (40.927049, -77.517123), in the western part of Miles Township. It is in the Brush Valley, part of the Ridge-and-Valley Province of the Appalachian Mountains. The valley lies between the parallel ridges of Nittany Mountain to the north and Brush Mountain to the south.

PA 445 intersects PA 192 at the southern end of Madisonburg; PA 192 leads east  to Rebersburg and southwest  to Centre Hall, while PA 445 follows PA 192 east for a short distance, then leads south through Brush Mountain and Shriner Mountain  to Millheim.

Demographics

As of the census of 2000, there were 135 people, 53 households, and 41 families residing in the CDP. The population density was 1,085.2 people per square mile (434.4/km). There were 56 housing units at an average density of 450.2/sq mi (180.2/km). The racial makeup of the CDP was 100.00% White.

There were 53 households, out of which 32.1% had children under the age of 18 living with them, 66.0% were married couples living together, 11.3% had a female householder with no husband present, and 22.6% were non-families. 17.0% of all households were made up of individuals, and 7.5% had someone living alone who was 65 years of age or older. The average household size was 2.55 and the average family size was 2.90.

In the CDP, the population was spread out, with 25.9% under the age of 18, 4.4% from 18 to 24, 28.1% from 25 to 44, 23.0% from 45 to 64, and 18.5% who were 65 years of age or older. The median age was 40 years. For every 100 females, there were 82.4 males. For every 100 females age 18 and over, there were 85.2 males.

The median income for a household in the CDP was $37,750, and the median income for a family was $39,750. Males had a median income of $30,313 versus $18,750 for females. The per capita income for the CDP was $16,231. There were no families and 2.4% of the population living below the poverty line, including no under eighteens and 12.0% of those over 64.

References

Census-designated places in Centre County, Pennsylvania
Census-designated places in Pennsylvania